Jennifer Boyden (born 1969) is an American poet and teacher.

Life
Jennifer Boyden grew up in Stillwater, Minnesota. She attended Creighton University (B.A., Creative Writing), and Eastern Washington University (M.F.A., Creative Writing, With Distinction).

Boyden's first book, The Mouths of Grazing Things, was selected by Robert Pinsky to receive the Brittingham Prize in Poetry in 2010 (University of Wisconsin Press). Her poetry is primarily lyrical and imagistic, and her themes often relate to environmental issues.

In 1999, she was awarded the PEN Northwest Wilderness Writing residency and lived in an isolated, remote wilderness region near the Rogue River in southern Oregon. Her work was influenced by this wilderness immersion. A later environmental project was funded by a grant from Washington State Artist Trust Gap Grants. For this project, Boyden walked hundreds of miles and wrote essays that arose from the walks.

Boyden also collaborates with visual artists. Projects that feature her text include work with Buster Simpson and her husband, visual artist Ian Boyden, as well as creative nonfiction responding to work by artists such as photographer Peter deLory.

She currently lives in Suzhou, China where she teaches at Soochow University. She has also taught at Walla Walla Community College and at Whitman College (Walla Walla, Washington). Eastern Washington University (Spokane, Washington), The Cambridge Center for Adult Education (Cambridge, Massachusetts), and the Sitka Center for Art and Ecology (Otis, Oregon). Her main teaching areas are creative writing, poetry, environmental literature, and experimental and cross-genre forms.

Books
 The Mouths of Grazing Things (2010, University of Wisconsin Press). Awarded the Brittingham Prize in Poetry
 Roots of Clouds, Transcendence of Stones (Sheehan Gallery, Whitman College, 2004). Essays, vignettes, and photographs regarding stones; written with geologist Terry Toedtemeier and artist Ian Boyden
 Evidence of Night (artist book, Crab Quill Press, 2003)
 Twenty Views of Cascade Head (artist book, Crab Quill Press, 2001)

Awards
 The Brittinghm Prize in poetry, 2010, selected by Robert Pinsky (University of Wisconsin Press)
 PEN Northwest Wilderness Writing Residency.
Washington State Artist Trust Gap Grant.
Distinguished Alumni Award
 Eastern Washington University, Inland Northwest Center for Writers, 2010
 Blue Mountain Arts Alliance grant awarded for Convergences, a public art sculpture installed in downtown Walla Walla, Washington, 2004.

References

External links
 2011 Interview
 Zhang Yunyun. For the enormity of it all

1969 births
Living people
Poets from Minnesota
People from Stillwater, Minnesota
Creighton University alumni
Eastern Washington University alumni
American women poets
Educators from Minnesota
American women educators
21st-century American poets
21st-century American women writers